Senator Haile may refer to:

Ferrell Haile (fl. 2000s–2010s), Tennessee State Senate
William H. Haile (1833–1901), Massachusetts State Senate
William Haile (New Hampshire politician) (1807–1876), New Hampshire State Senate

See also
Senator Hale (disambiguation)
Senator Hailey (disambiguation)
Senator Haley (disambiguation)